Erik Lund (born 6 November 1988) is a Swedish football manager and former player, who is the current manager of Ljungskile SK. He played as right back and spent most of his career at Ljungskile SK and IFK Göteborg. Lund also spent three years at the Aston Villa Academy and played twice for the Sweden national team in 2010.

Career
Lund began his career at Ljungskile SK, playing in the first team in both Swedish Division 2 and the Superettan, making his debut at 15. He went on to sign for Aston Villa's youth team on 1 July 2005 at the age of 16. After a season in the academy side he appeared in 10 games for Villa's reserves in the 2006–07 season, and scored a rare goal in the opening match of the HKFC International Soccer Sevens against Hong Kong F.C. in a 1–0 victory. On 3 June 2007 he signed a new 2-year professional contract with Villa. In August 2007, Lund made his debut for the first team, coming on as a substitute for Craig Gardner in the pre-season friendly against Walsall.

On 1 July 2008, Lund agreed to a three and a half year contract with IFK Göteborg. He made his debut for IFK in a Svenska Cupen win over GIF Sundsvall on 10 July. On 23 July he made his UEFA Champions League debut in IFK's 4–0 win over Murata. Lund moved to Varbergs BoIS following the 2013 season, after a loan spell at Örebro SK.

Career statistics

Club

International

Honours

Club
Ljungskile SK
Swedish Division 2 Västra Götaland (1): 2004

Aston Villa Academy
FA Premier Reserve League South (1): 2007/08
HKFC International Soccer Sevens (1): 2008

IFK Göteborg
Svenska Cupen (1): 2008

Örebro SK
 Superettan Runner-up (1): 2013 (Promotion to Allsvenskan)

References

External links

Erik Lund at Fotbolltransfers

1988 births
Living people
Association football defenders
Swedish footballers
Swedish expatriate footballers
Sweden international footballers
Sweden under-21 international footballers
Aston Villa F.C. players
IFK Göteborg players
Örebro SK players
Ljungskile SK players
Varbergs BoIS players
Allsvenskan players
Superettan players
Swedish expatriate sportspeople in England
Expatriate footballers in England